Shek Nga Shan is a 540 m high hill in Ma On Shan Country Park, Hong Kong.

Access
Shek Nga Shan can be reached via footpaths from Mui Tsz Lam or Fa Sam Hang. Nearby hills include Buffalo Hill and West Buffalo Hill.

References

Further reading
 

Mountains, peaks and hills of Hong Kong
Sha Tin District